The umbrella thorn, (Acacia planifrons), is a species of Acacia of the family Fabaceae. It is native to India and Sri Lanka. It is about 7m high thorny shrub. Greyish-brown bark is thick with horizontal markings. Leaves are bipinnate, alternate; apex obtuse; margin entire. Flowers are white in color. Fruit is a pod.

References

GROWTH RESPONSE OF ACACIA PLANIFRONS

planifrons
Flora of India (region)
Flora of Sri Lanka